Al-Madinah Museum (Arabic: متحف المدينة المنورة) is a museum in Al-Madinah, Saudi Arabia, that exhibits Al-Madinah heritage and history featuring different archaeological collections, visual galleries and rare images that related to Al-Medina. The museum exhibits around 2,000 rare artifacts that capture the heritage and culture of Al-Madinah and document the landscape, the people and how it has been shaped over the years. One of the parts of the tour is the evolution of Masjid Nabawi from a house, courtyard, and home to the massive complex that it is now.

History 
In 1983, a project was launched to transform Al-Hejaz Railway Station that was established in 1908, into a museum called Al-Madinah Museum, the project also included the establishment of Hejaz Railway Museum in the site. The museum is not to be confused with the privately run Dar al Madinah museum in the Eastern outskirts of the city.

Halls 
The museum consists of 14 halls including

 Museum Lobby
 Al-Madina environment, history and nature
 Al-Madina in Prophetic era
 Prophet Mohammed’s wives, his sons and daughters
 Mohajreen (migrants)
 Ansar (supporters)
 Prophetic Mosque
 Al-Madina in the reigns of Caliphs
 Al-Madina in the reign of First Saudi State
 Al-Madina in the reign of Second Saudi State
 Al-Madina in the reign of King Abdul Aziz
 Al-Madina Heritage

See also 

List of museums in Saudi Arabia

References 

Museums in Saudi Arabia
Tourist attractions in Medina
Museums established in 1983
1983 establishments in Saudi Arabia